Lakes named Summit Lake in Alaska include:
 Lower Summit Lake (Chugach National Forest, Alaska) (just north of the [Upper] Summit Lake) 
 Summit Lake (Becharof National Wildlife Refuge, Alaska) (near Kanatak Pass) 
 Summit Lake (Chugach National Forest, Alaska) (also known as Upper Summit Lake)
 Summit Lake (Denali State Park, Alaska) (near Chulitna Pass) 
 Summit Lake (Lake Clark National Park, Alaska) (near Lake Clark Pass) 
 Summit Lake (Paxson, Alaska)
 Summit Lake (Prince of Wales Island, Alaska) 
 Summit Lake (Willow, Alaska)
 Summit Lakes (Kenai Peninsula Borough, Alaska) (on the Chinkelyes Creek within the Chigmit Mountains) 
 Summit Lake, the source of Tlikakila River in Kenai Peninsula Borough, Alaska (Chigmit Mountains) 
 Summit Lakes (Tongass National Forest, Alaska) (on the Phipps Peninsula near the shore of the Gulf of Alaska)

See also
Summit Lake (disambiguation)

Lakes of Alaska